David Victoriano Munguía Payés is a former Salvadoran Army general and was Minister of Defense of El Salvador from 2009 to 2011 and again from 2013 to 2019.

Biography 

David Victoriano Munguía Payés was the Director of the Captain General Gerardo Barrios Military School from 1996 to 1997.

He was appointed as Minister of National Defense of El Salvador on 1 June 2009 by President Mauricio Funes. He served until 23 November 2011 and replaced by José Atilio Benítez Parada, but he was reinstated to the position on 12 July 2013. He left office on 1 June 2019 and was replaced by René Merino Monroy.

Munguía Payés was arrested on 23 July 2020 for allegedly negotiating a truce with the prominent gangs Mara Salvatrucha and 18th Street Gang during his term. A judge later ordered him to be placed under house arrest. In October 2020, eight properties worth 1.4 million dollars were confiscated from Munguía Payés by the Salvadoran government due to tax investigations indicating that they may have been attained through illegal activities.

See also 

Cabinet of Mauricio Funes
Cabinet of Salvador Sánchez Cerén

References 

Year of birth unknown
Living people
Salvadoran military personnel
Defence ministers of El Salvador
Captain General Gerardo Barrios Military School alumni
Year of birth missing (living people)